The UNESCO (United Nations Educational, Scientific and Cultural Organization) has designated 19 World Heritage Sites in six countries (also called "state parties") of Central and North Asia: Kazakhstan, Kyrgyzstan, Tajikistan, Turkmenistan, Uzbekistan and the Asian part of Russia. The European part of Russia is included in Eastern Europe.

Russia is home to the most inscribed sites with 8 sites, two of which are transborder properties shared with Mongolia in Eastern Asia. The first site from the region was the Itchan Kala in Uzbekistan inscribed in 1990. Each year, UNESCO's World Heritage Committee may inscribe new sites on the list, or delist sites that no longer meet the criteria. Selection is based on ten criteria: six for cultural heritage (i–vi) and four for natural heritage (vii–x). Some sites, designated "mixed sites," represent both cultural and natural heritage. In Northern and Central Asia, there are 11 cultural, 8 natural, and no mixed sites. All of the Russian sites (7) are natural and with the exception of Sayarka, all of the sites in Central Asia are cultural.

The World Heritage Committee may also specify that a site is endangered, citing "conditions which threaten the very characteristics for which a property was inscribed on the World Heritage List." None of the sites in this region has ever been listed as endangered, but possible danger listing has been considered by UNESCO in a number of cases.

Legend

Site; named after the World Heritage Committee's official designation
Location; at city, regional, or provincial level and geocoordinates
Criteria; as defined by the World Heritage Committee
Area; in hectares and acres. If available, the size of the buffer zone has been noted as well. A value of zero implies that no data has been published by UNESCO
Year; during which the site was inscribed to the World Heritage List
Description; brief information about the site, including reasons for qualifying as an endangered site, if applicable

World Heritage Sites

Tentative List

Notes

References
Notes

Asia

Central Asia